The Pac-12 Freshman of the Year is an annual award in the Pac-12 Conference presented to its top freshman player in men's basketball. The winner is chosen by the Pac-12 coaches. The honor began in 1978–79, when it was known as the Rookie of the Year and players in their first year in the conference, including transfers, were eligible. Junior guard Bryan Rison of Washington State was the first honoree and the only non-freshman to ever win. The candidates were limited to freshman starting in 1983–84, when the award was renamed to Freshman of the Year. The conference was known as the Pacific-10 before becoming the Pac-12 in 2011. Four winners were also named the conference's player of the year in the same year: Shareef Abdur-Rahim (California, 1996), Kevin Love (UCLA, 2008), Deandre Ayton (Arizona, 2018) and Evan Mobley (USC, 2021).

Key

Winners

Winners by school

References

Pac-12
Awards established in 1979
Freshman
College sports freshman awards